The 1968 Liège–Bastogne–Liège was the 54th edition of the Liège–Bastogne–Liège cycle race and was held on 28 April 1968. The race started and finished in Liège. The race was won by Valere Van Sweevelt of the Smith's team.

General classification

References

1968
1968 in Belgian sport
1968 Super Prestige Pernod